Air Marshal Jonnalagedda Chalapati, AVSM, VSM is an officer in the Indian Air Force. Currently, he is serving as the Air Officer Commanding-in-Chief (AOC-in-C), Southern Air Command. He took over the office on 3 October 2021, succeeding of Air Marshal Manavendra Singh.

Early life and education
He is an alumnus of National Defence Academy Khadagwasla and Air Force Academy Hyderabad. He has completed his National Defence Course from Bangladesh and Masters Degree in Military Studies from King's College London.

Career
Jonnalagedda Chalapati was commissioned as a fighter pilot in the Indian Air Force on December 22, 1983. He has flying experience on various aircraft including HAL Tejas.

Chalapati is a Qualified Flying Instructor and an Experimental Test Pilot and has about 3311 hrs of operational flight experience. He had served as a test pilot at Hindustan Aeronautics Limited working with DRDO on various projects.

He has held various appointments including Command of an Operational Squadron, commanded the AFS Bagdogra. Served as the Project Director (Flight Test) at National Flight Test Center, Aeronautical Development Agency. He was the Commandant at Air Force Academy, Dundigal. 

Previous to his present assignment, he had served as Senior Air Staff Officer for the Southern Air Command from 1 August 2020 to 2 October 2021.

Awardsand decorations 
Chalapati has been awarded the Vishisht Seva Medal (VSM) in 2012 and the Ati Vishisht Seva Medal in 2022.

Personal life 
Jonnalagedda Chalapati is married to Mrs Smitha Gayatri who is President of Air Force Wives Welfare Association (Regional). The couple is blessed with two children.

References 

Indian Air Force air marshals
Recipients of the Vishisht Seva Medal
Living people
Year of birth missing (living people)
Telugu people
People from Andhra Pradesh
Commandants of the Indian Air Force Academy
Recipients of the Ati Vishisht Seva Medal